Sengadal (The Dead Sea) is a 2011 Indian Tamil-language independent film written and directed by Leena Manimekalai, who makes her directing debut and stars in the film. Produced by Janaki Sivakumar, the film features cinematography by M. J. Radhakrishnan and editing by Sreekar Prasad. The film was initially banned by the regional centre of the Censor Board, but Appellate Tribunal authorities of the board at New Delhi cleared the film in July 2011 after legal struggle. Sengadal was part of the Indian Panorama at the 42nd International Film Festival of India after the censor board had cleared the film.

Cast 
 Shobasakthi 
 Leena Manimekalai
 Nimal
 Rosemarry

Plot 
On the Indian mainland, across the waters, arrive the Tamil refugees from Sri Lanka, an unending stream of people dispossessed of their lands and Gods, to an uncertain future with ever receding hopes of return. Dhanushkodi, the Indo-Sri Lankan border town, is the crucible wherein History is brewing this concoction of defeated lives and exhausted dreams. Hope is a big word and resistance but a tired expression. Three decades of struggle for a nation is washed out, a race obliterated. For, there is no one fighting their war back home now. Heroic images have turned to dust. The bunkers run with the wasted blood. Smoke rises from heaps of putrid flesh. Unwanted lives rot away in barbed wire human zoos. The misery spills over to the Indian shore. Fishermen fishing in fear in ignorance of friendly and enemy waters get dumped as rebels, spies and smugglers and unceremoniously beaten to death or shot or maimed. Yet, each morning sees their boats launched once again to the sea as the sea is their motherland and the language of fish their mother tongue. Manimekalai, the filmmaker, Munusamy, the fisherman, Rosemary, the social worker in Jesuit Christian Refugee Services, try hard to retain their sanity in this mad jumble. Their interactions with the dead or living refugees, their skirmishes with the Indian and Sri Lankan States, their personal lives overrun by external events - form the kernel of this narration. Soori, a half-wit Sri Lankan Tamil, who connects to the world through his radio, stands aloof in this bleak world of despair sending lightning jolts of truth into the dark recesses of History. No wonder, he vanishes into the blue and Manimekalai is forced by the State to return to the world of civil obedience. Munusamy is killed and Rosemary turns to her God, the same God who parted the Red Sea to save his flock in their flight from annihilation.

Production 
This film was a people participatory work, says director. The movie was filmed in Dhanuskodi, India which is just 18 km from Sri Lanka. When talking about the movie, the director says, the real victory of her movie would be, even if one fisherman is saved from killing of Sri Lankan navy. Writer, director, producer Leena Manimekalai, tried gather funds via crowd sourcing for the distribution of the movie.

List of official selections 
 Sengadal the DeadSea had won the GFI Production grant for 2010
 Only Tamil film to be screened at the 42nd International Film Festival of India. 
 Official Selection, International Competition, 32nd Durban International Film Festival, August 2011
 Official Selection, First Film Competition, 35th World Montreal Film Festival, September 2011
 Official Selection, International Competition, Mumbai Film Fest, MAMI, October 2011
 NAWFF Award (Best Asian Woman Film award), Tokyo International Film Festival, November 2011
 Indian Panorama, Indian International Film Festival, Goa, December 2011
 World Cinema Official Selection, International Film Festival of Kerala, 2011
 Chithrabarathi Competition, Bangalore International Film Festival, 2011
 Official Korean Premiere, International Women Film Festival, South Korea, 2012 
 Official Taiwan Premiere, International Women Film Festival, Taipei, 2012 
 NAWFF Premieres at International Women Film Festivals at Israel and Beijing,  2012
 Pecheurs De Monde International Film Festival, Lorient, France, 2013
 Rare Picks at Hundred years of Indian Cinema Package, 2013

References

External links
  (IMDb)

2011 films
English-language Indian films
Films directed by Leena Manimekalai
2010s Tamil-language films
2011 directorial debut films